Joseph Octave Reaume (August 13, 1856 – June 12, 1933) was an Ontario physician and political figure. He represented Essex North in the Legislative Assembly of Ontario from 1902 to 1914 as a Conservative member.

He was born in Anderdon Township, Essex County, Canada West, the son of farmer Oliver Reaume, and received his teacher's certificate in 1873. He taught school and pursued further studies in Toronto and Sandwich (later Windsor). He went on to study medicine at the Detroit College of Medicine and Trinity College, setting up practice in Windsor. He married Catherine Turner in 1887.

He served as Commissioner of Public Works in 1905 and Minister of Public Works from 1905 to 1914. During his time as the first Franco-Ontarian cabinet minister, the government of Sir James Pliny Whitney decided to impose Regulation 17, which effectively placed severe restrictions on all French instruction in the province's bilingual elementary schools following the Merchant Report in 1912. Reaume defended the government's policy and its subsequent modifications in Regulation 18 which allowed for one hour of French instruction per day in the previously bilingual schools. Reaume argued that many Franco-Ontarian parents actually wished that their children would receive a first class education in English in order to access better paying jobs. Nevertheless, many Franco-Ontarian parents, children and teachers protested this new policy by marching out of their classrooms upon the arrival of the ministry appointed school inspectors. Reaume subsequently paid the price, when voters in the riding of Windsor voted against him in 1914, electing his Liberal opponent.

He died at Sandwich, Ontario in 1933.

References

External links 

Commemorative biographical record of the county of Essex, Ontario ... (1905)

For more information about Joseph Octave Reaume see Jack D. Cecillon, Prayers Petitions and Protests: The Catholic Church and the Ontario Schools Crisis in the Windsor Border Region, 1910–1927, (Kingston: McGill-Queen's University Press, 2013).

1856 births
1933 deaths
Franco-Ontarian people
Progressive Conservative Party of Ontario MPPs
Wayne State University alumni